Quartet is the sixth studio album by the British new wave band Ultravox. The album peaked at no.6 on the UK Albums Chart and was certified Gold by the BPI in December 1982 for 100,000 copies sold. It also peaked at #13 in Germany, and at #61 in the United States.

Background
After three albums produced by Conny Plank, Ultravox dropped their longtime producer. Vocalist/guitarist Midge Ure explained, "It was getting a bit safe. We knew if we recorded with him again it would be great and we'd be really happy. But there would be no excitement."

Quartet was produced by George Martin, most notable for his work with The Beatles. The album was recorded 1982 in Air Studios June to July in London, July to August in Montserrat.

George Martin chose to take the job because his daughter was an Ultravox fan. He said in 1983 in the Monument video: "They are without a doubt the most musical group I have come across in recent years."

The cover artwork was designed by Peter Saville.

They had already decided that they didn't want to write the songs in the studio like they did with Rage in Eden so they developed a pattern whereby they’d gone into a rehearsal studio for three weeks and put down ideas. Then they took a week off and listened to the cassettes and pulled out the best bits and thought about lyrics. They did that for three months and found that they had no shortage of ideas, although fitting them together was a problem sometimes, as they kept having to cut out bits they liked. But at the end of that time there were eight complete songs so there were no excuse for not recording. One of the basic philosophies of the band has been that constant change and development was important to their music. So they started thinking about a new producer. When George Martin's name came up it sounded a more strange and bizarre combination than the names who'd been suggested to the band, and, as they’d been looking for something more off-the-wall for this album, they all agreed that he was the man for the job.

Billy Currie said about the recording 1982: "We put all the tracks down in four weeks at Air Studios in Oxford Circus, which was quite frantic. I think George Martin did a lot on the vocals but he also influenced us quite a bit on one or two of the musical arrangements. And then when we went over to Montserrat, it was exactly the same mixing desk and speakers, but you have got time to think about it and organise all this energy, because there was a lot of energy on the tracks."

Warren Cann said about the recording: "It didn't turn out quite as we'd imagined. Perhaps George was tired or perhaps we were suffering from our own misconceptions, but it was a rather sedate experience and not the liberating sonic voyage we were expecting. However, I wouldn't trade that adventure for anything. When we approached him we were well aware that he'd been working with more, shall we say, conservative acts. We made it clear we weren't wallflowers in the studio, if we needed to bring in fifty washing machines, fill them full of rocks, mic them up, and turn them all to spin-cycle - then we'd do it. We were very up front about it. We were game for anything. During the recording of "Quartet," I often sat there thinking, "Wow! Pinch me! I'm working with George Martin and Geoff Emerick, producer and engineer of Sgt. Pepper!"

"It was done at probably the highest level we’d ever worked at. I wasn’t disappointed with the album but I was very disappointed with a certain element that criticised us for using George Martin. They completely misunderstood. They saw it as being safe and conservative and thought we’d sold out by going dull and commercial and we just scratched our heads at that."

The Monument Tour became the largest tour Ultravox made. The tour started in November 1982 to May 1983 with shows in Europe, United States, Canada and Japan. The support band were Messengers who also sang backing vocals with Ultravox.

Release
The album was released in October 1982. Four singles, "Reap the Wild Wind", "Hymn", "Visions in Blue" and "We Came to Dance", were released from the album, all of which reached the UK Top 20. The album was also released as a marble picture disc LP, a cassette and, in 1983, a CD. The band promoted the album with their "Monument Tour" in late 1982, one of the shows from which was recorded and released as an album and video in 1983.

Remasters
Quartet was remastered and re-released on CD by EMI in 1998 with the B-sides to each of the album's singles as bonus tracks. Another remastered version, a 2-disc set with previously unreleased material, was released in February 2009.

Track listing
All songs written by Warren Cann, Chris Cross, Billy Currie and Midge Ure.

Original release (CDL 1394)
Side A
"Reap the Wild Wind" – 3:49
"Serenade" – 5:05
"Mine for Life" – 4:44
"Hymn" – 5:46
Side B
"Visions in Blue" – 4:38
"When the Scream Subsides" – 4:17
"We Came to Dance" – 4:14
"Cut and Run" – 4:18
"The Song" (We Go) – 3:56

1998 CD re-release (7243 4 96823 2 0)
"Reap the Wild Wind" – 3:49
"Serenade" – 5:05
"Mine for Life" – 4:44
"Hymn" – 5:46
"Visions in Blue" – 4:38
"When the Scream Subsides" – 4:17
"We Came to Dance" – 4:14
"Cut and Run" – 4:18
"The Song" (We Go) – 3:56
"Hosanna (In Excelsis Deo)" – 4:21 (bonus track)
"Monument" – 3:16 (bonus track)
"Break Your Back" – 3:27 (bonus track)
"Overlook" – 4:04 (bonus track)

2009 Remastered Definitive Edition (B001OD6HFO)
Disc 1
"Reap the Wild Wind" – 3:49
"Serenade" – 5:05
"Mine for Life" – 4:46
"Hymn" – 5:49
"Visions in Blue" – 4:40
"When the Scream Subsides" – 4:16
"We Came to Dance" – 4:13
"Cut and Run" – 4:17
"The Song (We Go)" – 3:59

Disc 2
"Reap the Wild Wind" (Extended 12" Version) – 4:45 
"Hosanna (In Excelsis Deo)" (B-side of Reap the Wild Wind) – 4:21
"Monument" (B-side of Hymn) – 3:14
"The Thin Wall (Live)" (B-side of Hymn 12") – 5:54 
"Break Your Back" (B-side of Visions in Blue) – 3:25
"Reap the Wild Wind" (Live) – 4:04
"We Came to Dance" (Extended 12" Version) – 7:35
"Overlook" (B-side of We Came to Dance) – 4:03
"The Voice" (Fanclub Flexi-disc Version) (Live) – 4:36
"Serenade" (Special Remix) – 6:03
"New Europeans" (Live) – 4:18
"We Stand Alone" (Live) – 5:35
"I Remember (Death in the Afternoon)" (Live) – 6:25

 Track 4 recorded live at Hammersmith Odeon, 17 October 1981.
 Tracks 6, 9, 11-13 recorded live at Hammersmith Odeon, 5 December 1982.

Personnel
Ultravox
 Warren Cann – drums, backing vocals
 Chris Cross – bass, synthesizer, backing vocals
 Billy Currie – keyboards, violin
 Midge Ure – guitar, lead vocals

Additional personnel
 George Martin – production
 Geoff Emerick – engineering
 Mark Freegard – recording and mixing of "Break Your Back" at Wessex Studios
 Jon Jacobs – assistance
 Peter Saville – cover design

Charts

References 

1982 albums
Ultravox albums
Albums produced by George Martin
Chrysalis Records albums